The Sioux Theatre is located in Sioux Rapids, Iowa, United States.  The 375 seat movie theater was designed in the Moderne style by the Des Moines architectural firm Wetherell & Harrison.  It was built by C.I. Hersom Construction.  Initially owned by Don and Edna Gram, it opened in September 1946.  Two Strong Lume-X projectors were added in 1974 when the theater was owned by Michael Berger.  The Sioux Rapids Historical Association acquired the building and turned it into a museum.  It was listed on the National Register of Historic Places in 2012.

References

Theatres completed in 1946
Museums in Buena Vista County, Iowa
Modernist architecture in Iowa
National Register of Historic Places in Buena Vista County, Iowa
Theatres on the National Register of Historic Places in Iowa